Akavi Yeptho (born 2 September 1997) is an Indian cricketer. He made his List A debut on 27 February 2021, for Nagaland in the 2020–21 Vijay Hazare Trophy.

References

External links
 

1997 births
Living people
Indian cricketers
Nagaland cricketers
Place of birth missing (living people)